Ahmad Youssef El Naamani (born 12 October 1979) is a Lebanese former footballer who played as a defender for the Lebanese national team during the 2000 AFC Asian Cup.

Club career 
El Naamani joined Nejmeh on 9 September 2005.

See also
 List of Lebanon international footballers born outside Lebanon

References

External links
 
 
 

Lebanese footballers
Lebanon youth international footballers
Lebanon international footballers
1979 births
Living people
Association football defenders
Lebanese Premier League players
Safa SC players
Nejmeh SC players
Akhaa Ahli Aley FC players
Sportspeople from Mecca
2000 AFC Asian Cup players
Asian Games competitors for Lebanon
Footballers at the 1998 Asian Games
Footballers at the 2002 Asian Games